Katalin Keserü (born 4 October 1946 in Pécs, Hungary) is a Hungarian award-winning artist and professor emeritus (since 2013) in the Department of Art History at Faculty of Humanities of the Eötvös Loránd University. From 2000 to 2006, she was managing director of the Ernst Museum in Budapest.

Education
Master of Arts: Art History, 1975 Eötvös Loránd University, Budapest.
PhD: History of Art, 1995, Eötvös University, Budapest
Habilitation: art history, 2003, Eötvös University, Budapest

Awards
1990: Mihály Munkácsy Prize (:hu:Munkácsy Mihály-díj)
1992: Noémi Ferenczy Prize (:hu:Ferenczy Noémi-díj)
2007: Széchenyi Prize
2010: Prima Award (:hu:Prima-díj)

References

1946 births
Living people
20th-century Hungarian women artists
21st-century Hungarian women artists
People from Pécs
Academic staff of Eötvös Loránd University
Eötvös Loránd University alumni